Kahnak or Kohnak or Kohonak or Kohnek or Kehnak or Kahnok or Kahanok may refer to:

Kohnak, Hormozgan
Kohnak, Bashagard, Hormozgan Province
Kahnak, Bardsir, Kerman Province
Kahnak, Manujan, Kerman Province
Kahnok, Qaleh Ganj, Kerman Province
Kohnak, Khuzestan
Kahnak, Chabahar, Sistan and Baluchestan Province
Kahanok (27°26′ N 59°36′ E), Dalgan, Sistan and Baluchestan Province
Kahanok (27°26′ N 59°37′ E), Dalgan, Sistan and Baluchestan Province
Kahnok, Hudiyan, Dalgan County, Sistan and Baluchestan Province
Kahnok Ladi, Dalgan County, Sistan and Baluchestan Province
Kahnak, Nukabad, Khash County, Sistan and Baluchestan Province
Kahnak, Tehran

See also
Kahnag (disambiguation)